Glossocalyx is a monotypic genus of flowering plants belonging to the family Siparunaceae. The only species is Glossocalyx longicuspis.

Its native range is Southern Nigeria to Western Central Tropical Africa.

References

Siparunaceae
Monotypic Laurales genera